Marione Fourie (born 30 April 2002) is a South African athlete who competes in the high hurdles.

In 2022, Fourie became national champion for the second time, and won the bronze medal at the African Championships in the 100 metres hurdles. She is just the third South African woman of all time to run below 13 seconds for the event. At the 2022 World Athletics Championships, Fourie ran 12.94 seconds to qualify for the semi finals finishing behind Olympic bronze medalist Megan Tapper in her heat.

References

External links
 

2002 births
Living people
South African female hurdlers
White South African people
World Athletics Championships athletes for South Africa
South African Athletics Championships winners
21st-century South African women